Homecoming Scotland 2009 was a series of events designed to attract people of Scottish ancestry to visit Scotland. The campaign, organised by EventScotland and VisitScotland on behalf of the Scottish Government, and part-financed by the European Regional Development Fund, claimed that "for every single Scot in their native land, there are thought to be at least five more overseas who can claim Scottish ancestry."

2009 was the 250th anniversary of the birth of Robert Burns, the national poet. In addition to Burns-related events, the other four themes of the Homecoming were Scotland's culture and heritage, great Scottish minds and innovations, and golf and whisky.

Calendar of Events 
On 16 June 2008 Scotland's First Minister,  Alex Salmond MSP MP, officially launched Homecoming Scotland 2009 at Edinburgh Castle. The Homecoming started on 25 January 2009 (Burns night) and ran until 30 November 2009 (St Andrews Day).

On 24 July 2009 a Clan Convention, composed of the clan chiefs, clan commanders and leading clan representatives of Scottish clans, met to discuss the "Role of the Clan in the 21st century". The Clan Convention took place within the Scottish Parliament.

The centrepiece event of the year was The Gathering 2009, on 25 and 26 July, centred on Holyrood Park in Edinburgh. The clan gathering included highland games over the two days, a parade up the Royal Mile and a 'clan pageant' on the castle esplanade. 
Prince Charles, the Duke of Rothesay, is to be Patron of The Gathering 2009.

There was a long list of homecoming events, including several well-established events, e.g. (in date order):
Celtic Connections
Burns Night
Jack Vettriano loans painting to Kirkcaldy Museum, Fife for Homecoming 2009
Aye Write!
Glasgow International Comedy Festival
Etape Caledonia
Edinburgh International Science Festival
Cape Wrath Challenge
Heineken Cup Final
Edinburgh Sevens
Return to the Ridings
Royal Highland Show
Homecoming Live
Edinburgh International Film Festival
World Fly Fishing Championships
Open Championship, Turnberry
Inverness Highland Games
Wickerman Festival
Belladrum Tartan Heart Festival
Johnnie Walker Championship, Gleneagles
Edinburgh International Festival
Edinburgh Military Tattoo
World Pipe Band Championships
Piping Live! - Glasgow International Piping Festival
Cowal Gathering
Doors Open Days
Wigtown Book Festival
Loch Ness Marathon
Royal National Mòd
Scots Trad Music Awards

Scottish Cup Sponsorship

In October 2008, it was announced that the Scottish Cup would be re-branded as The Homecoming Scottish Cup for the 2008/09 competition. Glasgow-based businessman Willie Haughey signed a two-year sponsorship deal for the cup, handing the branding rights over to the Scottish Government. A new name was applied to the 2009/10 competition.

See also 
2009 in Scotland
Diaspora
Golf in Scotland
Homecoming
Scotch whisky
Scottish clan
Scottish people
Tourism in Scotland
The Gathering 2009
The Gathering Ireland 2013

References

External links 
 links to press coverage of The Gathering and Homecoming
 
 The Gathering 2009, Edinburgh
 Homecoming Ayrshire
 Robert Burns- Bard of the Scottish Enlightenment, play at the Edinburgh Festival Fringe
    Fyvie Homecoming Festival,  28-30 August 2009 Fyvie, Aberdeenshire

2009 in Scotland
Reunions
 Homecoming
Scottish diaspora
Scottish Government
Robert Burns
Tourism campaigns
Tourism in Scotland